Bear Facts can refer to:

 Bear Facts (film), a 1938 Our Gang short
 The Bear Facts, an episode of Garfield and Friends